Arkansas Highway 107 is the name of multiple state highways in Arkansas.

Section 1
Arkansas Highway 107 is a state highway of  that runs in Faulkner and Cleburne counties.

Route description
AR 107 begins at AR 36 near Holland. The route runs north to meet AR 25 and AR 225 before entering Quitman and Cleburne County. In Quitman, AR 25 also meets AR 124, which it follows east out of town. After breaking north, AR 107 reunites with AR 25 north to an area just south of Heber Springs. AR 107 ends at AR 110 in Heber Springs.

Major intersections

Section 2
Arkansas Highway 107 is a state highway of  that runs in Pulaski and Faulkner counties.

Route description

AR 107 begins at Interstate 40 in North Little Rock and runs through some suburbs until entering Faulkner County. The route runs north to terminate at US 64B in Vilonia.

Major intersections

See also

 List of state highways in Arkansas

References

External links

107
Transportation in Cleburne County, Arkansas
Transportation in Faulkner County, Arkansas
Transportation in Pulaski County, Arkansas